Josefina Báez is a Dominican actress. She is the founder and present director of Ay Ombe Theatre Troupe (estd. 1986). She was born in La Romana and moved to New York when she was 12 years old. Baez is best known for her performance texts Dominicanish, Comrade, Bliss Ain't Playing and Levente no. Yolayorkdominicanyork.

Baez describes herself as "a performer-writer-educator-director whose work explores the present and its encounters with the past and future." Baez has been involved with multiple theatre festivals and travels globally conducting Ay Ombe workshops and theatre retreats.  She often writes about her bi-lingual and bi-cultural experiences.

Works

Written 

 Dominicanish
 Comrade, Bliss ain't playing and its translations to Russian (by Olga Gak), Hindi (Reema Moudgil), Swedish (Maria Roddrick), Spanish (Marcela Reales Visbal), Portuguese (Cristiane Lírica) and Italian Arisleyda Dilone.
 Dramaturgia I & II
 Como la Una/Como Uma (in Spanish & Portuguese)
 Levente no. Yolayorkdominicanyork.
 Canto de Plenitud
 As Is E (An anthology)
Why is my name Marysol? (A children story)

Baez's works have been published in Forward Motion Magazine (NYC), Brujula/Compass (Latin American Writers Institute (NYC)), Ventana Abierta (University of California), Tertuliando/Hanging Out (Anthology of Dominican women writers in New York), Vetas (Dominican Republic), Caribbean Connections: Moving North (NECA/Washington, Dominicanish (NYC) and the Beacon Press 2001 Anthology. .

Dominicanish had a performance life of 10 fruitful years. The text has also been translated into Bengali.

Themes 

Baez's works are related to the communities that she belong, mainly a penta-ocean that she swims up, down and around: her migrant-womanhood-working class-black-heart centric self. In her own interpretation:

Sound and silence                                    movimiento y quietud

Movement and stillness                 sonidos silencios

All colors        All textures                          las gamas de los colores

Swimming in all possibilities                      texturas melodias                  en encuentros posibles

A review of Comrade, Bliss ain't Playing describes the work as "an intimate journey dressed up with a beautiful vulnerability"

Pulitzer Prize winner Junot Díaz has said of Baez:

Josefina Báez has been breaking open hearts and re-ordering minds for more years than I care to count. She is one of North America's finest artists and she is, without question, one of my favorite writers.  She is a sword bathed in flame, she's a marvel. Levente no.Yolayorkdominicanyork is her finest work yet.

Baez uses her writing and performance to make several comments on race and identity.  One thing she does is embrace her blackness and her Dominican heritage, something referred to as a "double-consciousness." In addition to embracing her black and dominican identities, she must also acknowledge her identities of being an immigrant and trans-migrant, themes common in her writing and performances. When a dominican migrates to the United States, they are then neither considered fully Dominican or American.  The individual is then considered to only partially belong to both cultures, creating an "in-betweenness." By embracing and expressing her many identities and using her performances to share them, she is resisting America's attempt to marginalize her experience. Despite living in New York City, a racially and culturally diverse setting, Baez and other immigrants still feel the struggle everyday of not being accepted.

Performance Autology 
Josefina Baez has also created a system of art, based on her own learning, called "Performance Autology". It has been described as:
 
"It approaches the creative process from the autobiography of the doer. Technically kept to the core, this path is developed in sobriety. The physical, mental and spiritual realms are researched and nurtured. Sources in this study includes theatre biomechanics, yoga, meditation, calligraphy, world dance, music, literature, theatre, popular culture, tea culture, video arts, social, health and healing sciences, among others."

Retreats 
Baez and Ay Ombe organize theatre retreats internationally.

Ay Ombe Retreats have already been held at:

 Christchurch, New Zealand:February 2004;
 Pirque and Miravalle, Chile:February 2005, April 2006, November 2007; 
 Bangalore, India:January 2009
 New York State: August 2009.
 Sonido del Yaque Eco-lodge: Jarabacoa, Dominican Republic 2015
 Black Mountain, North Carolina 2013, 2014, 2015, 2016

Performances 

Baez's 2009 performance of Dominicanish marked its 10th anniversary and took place at Harlem Stage, New York from November 6–8, 2009.

The word 'dominicanish' is used to describe her experience because, as a result of her migration, she is not only dominican. It deals with issues of migration and absorption of new cultures.  Even her use of combining english and Spanish is an example of her being in-between two cultures.  As she retells her experience of learning english, she moves her mouth and body in unique ways, while her feet remain still.  This shows how American society is trying to force her to assimilate into their culture and her resistance to doing so. Baez draws heavily from her own experiences as an immigrant from the Dominican Republic.  Being a Dominican immigrant, Baez possesses multiple identities. In Dominicanish, her identity is defined as always being in motion.  She is constantly moving between cultures or physically between two countries. This motion is expressed through her  body movement as she is performing.  The play is published slightly different throughout its editions since the state of the dominican immigrant is not static.  In her performance of Dominicanish, she uses examples of daily activities as ways to resist a culture that is trying to erase her colored body. The one-woman play is directed by Claudio Mir and was accompanied by trumpet music by Ross Huff.

The performance, which went under the title "OM is 10" was followed by an academic symposium "Dialogue Dominicanish" organized and co-ordinated by Esther Hernandez (Brown University). Participants included: Conrad James (Birmingham University, UK), Arturo Victoriano (University of Toronto, Canada), Danny Mendez (Michigan State University), Sophie Mariñez (CUNY Graduate Center), Nestor Rodriguez (University of Toronto, Canada), Merle Collins (University of Maryland, USA) and Percy Encinas (Universidad Cientifica del Sur, Peru).

On March 6, 2015, Josefina directed a performance with students from Spanish 126: "Performing Latinidad" to discuss issues of identity and to bring the texts from their class to life. Professor Lorgia H. García Peña, an assistant professor of Romance Languages and Literatures teaches the course at Harvard University.

Many of Baez's performances are easily accessible to the public. In addition to performing on large stages, she also performs in smaller settings such as people's homes, on the street, in parks, and schools. This ultimately allows her performances to reach a wider audience and become more intimate. Her performance of Apartarte/Casarte is often performed in various locations, even in Baez's own home on one occasion.  During this performance in front of only 12 people, she interacts with the audience throughout the performance.  Apartarte/Casarte is a performance in which Baez combines parts from her other performances to comment on several themes such as her immigrant experience and marriage.  There is a part where Baez expresses her happiness of being newly married, which quickly transitions to her frustration of being expected to live up to gendered housewife duties as she angrily performs acts of domesticity.  In this performance, she is resisting the treatment of women and traditional gender roles.

References 

Living people
American stage actresses
Dominican Republic emigrants to the United States
People from La Romana, Dominican Republic
Year of birth missing (living people)
21st-century American women